Celiptera teretilinea is a moth of the family Erebidae. It is found in southern Brazil.

References

Moths described in 1852
Celiptera
Moths of South America
Taxa named by Achille Guenée